The Alma was a French automobile manufactured by Établissements Alma in Courbevoie, Seine, between 1926 and 1929.

Only a few cars of this marque were produced. The most significant model (maybe the only one) was a two-seater coupé called Alma6 or Alma Six, referring to the proprietary in-line six cylinder engine of 1642 cc. The relatively small engines with three valves to a cylinder were developed by an aero engineer named Henri Vaslin. The engine was so flexible that a 2 speed gearbox was used. Alma cars were equipped with four wheel brakes.

References
Georgano, G.N., "Alma", in G.N. Georgano, ed., The Complete Encyclopedia of Motorcars 1885-1968 (New York: E.P. Dutton and Co., 1974), pp. 36.

Vintage vehicles
Defunct motor vehicle manufacturers of France